This is a list of the world's record-breaking top speeds achieved by street-legal production cars (as opposed to concept cars or modified cars). For the purposes of this list eligible cars are defined in the list's rules. This list uses a different definition to the List of automotive superlatives. The variation is because the term production car is otherwise undefined.

List rules 

Because of the inconsistencies with the various definitions of production cars, dubious claims by manufacturers and self-interest groups, and inconsistent or changing application of the definitions this list has a defined set of requirements. For further explanation of how these were arrived at see the talk pages of both this article and the above link. After the Koenigsegg Agera RS was found not eligible for this list since only 11 cars had engines rated higher than 865 kW, the former 25 car minimum was dropped and replaced with new rules based on suggestions by Koenigsegg PR manager Steven Wade.

Post 1945 and over  only 
The Benz Velo as the first petrol driven car is the only exception.

Production car definition 
For the purposes of this list, a production car is defined as a vehicle that is:

 constructed principally for retail sale to consumers, for their personal use, to transport people on public roads (no commercial or industrial vehicles are eligible)
 available for commercial sale to the public in the same specification as the vehicle used to achieve the record
 manufactured in the record-claiming specification by a manufacturer whose WMI number is shown on the VIN, including vehicles that are modified by either professional tuners or others that result in a VIN with a WMI number in their name (for example, cars manufactured by RUF with Porsche parts and RUF's WMI W09 are eligible; cars modified by them with Porsche's WMI, WP0, aren't)
 pre-1981 vehicles must be made by the original vehicle manufacturer and not modified by either professional tuners or individuals
 street-legal in its intended markets, having fulfilled the homologation tests or inspections required under either a) United States of America, b) European Union, or c) Japanese law to be granted this status
 sold in more than one national market.

Measurement of top speed 
To establish the top speed for cars the requirement is, in addition to the above, an independent road test with a two-way run. The mean of the top speed for both runs is taken as the car's top speed. In instances where the top speed has been determined by removing the limiter, the test met these requirements, and the car is sold with the limiter on then the limited speed is accepted as meeting this requirement. For the McLaren F1 the estimation by Car and Driver about the speed at the rev-limiter is used.

Record-breaking production vehicles

Difficulties with claims 
Comparing claimed speeds of the fastest production cars in the world, especially in historical cases, is difficult as there is no standardized method for determining the top speed and no central authority to verify any such claims. Examples of the difficulties faced were highlighted in a two-week long dispute regarding Bugatti's record set in 2010, and Hennessey's 2013 claim that their own top speed runslower than Bugatti's, lacking the required two-way average, and lacking the minimum 25 car production runwas the real record, due to an issue regarding electronic limiters.

Bugatti Veyron limiter removal 
On 4 July 2010, the Bugatti Veyron Super Sport reached  for a two-way average. Bugatti built 30 identical Super Sports, with 5 of them named World Record Edition. All 30 were equipped with electronic limiters, but the World Record Edition had their limiters turned off for the record attempt. Guinness Book of Records, which had listed speeds by British cars with modified rev. limiter as production car records in the 1990s, listed the unlimited  as the production car speed record.

In April 2013, following a press release claiming the record for the Hennessey Venom GT due to the electronic limiter issue, The Sunday Times quoted Guinness public relations director Jaime Strang as saying: "As the car's speed limiter was deactivated, this modification was against the official guidelines. Five days later, Guinness World Records officially posted on its website that it: "...would like to confirm that Bugatti's record has not been disqualified; the record category is currently under review." Five days later Bugatti's speed record was confirmed: "Following a thorough review conducted with a number of external experts, Guinness World Records is pleased to announce the confirmation of Bugatti's record of Fastest production car achieved by the Veyron 16.4 Super Sport. The focus of the review was with respect to what may constitute a modification to a car's standard specification. Having evaluated all the necessary information, Guinness World Records is now satisfied that a change to the speed limiter does not alter the fundamental design of the car or its engine."

Cars excluded from the list 
Some cars were not considered to be the fastest production vehicles, for various reasons. Here is a list of some well-known cars that have not been able to meet standards needed to be the fastest production car.

See also 
 History of the automobile
 Land speed record
 List of fastest production cars by acceleration
 List of production cars by power output
List of production cars by specific power

References 

Car-related lists
Car performance